The Wonderful Stories of Professor Kitzel is a 1972 educational animated series. Produced by Shamus Culhane for Krantz Films, the program combined film clips, animation, and commentary to teach the viewers about historic and cultural events. It was "hosted" by the eccentric scientist Professor Kitzel, whose voice was provided by Paul Soles, with occasional appearances by his grandfather or his parrot.

Format
The format of each short (5 minute) episode, of which one hundred and six were produced in all, was generally an opening discussion by the professor introducing the subject. He would then take the viewer to his time machine, pull a lever and the first series of drawings and commentary related to the subject would begin. Halfway through the story, the professor would interrupt the commentary to make some humorous remark, before returning to the narrative with an invitation to "Let's see what happened next." Each episode concluded with some humorous closing sequence.

Distribution
The series was offered in barter syndication by Bristol-Myers for their Pal Vitamins line from 1972 to 1976; after 1976, it was syndicated for cash by Worldvision Enterprises.

Forerunner
The format of the series and style of presentation was similar to an earlier production, Max, the 2000-Year-Old Mouse, which utilized the same production house and voice cast.

Episodes

 Martin Frobisher
 The Crusades
 The Spartans
 Charlemagne and the Elephant
 Leonardo da Vinci
 Samuel F.B. Morse
 Profile of Japan
 Mayan Archaeology
 Charles Darwin (2)
 The Sahara Desert
 Charles Dickens
 Thomas Edison
 Buffalo Bill Cody
 Joan of Arc
 India (1)
 Pilgrims
 Montezuma and Cortez
 Peary at the Pole
 Edmund Hillary and Mount Everest
 The Mississippi Steamboat
 Reptiles
 The Rosetta Stone
 The South Pole
 Auguste Piccard
 Abba of Benin
 India (2)
 The Oracle of Delphi
 Northwest Indians
 Daniel Boone
 Jacques Cartier
 The Great London Fire
 The Masai Warriors
 Marco Polo
 The Wright Brothers
 New Amsterdam
 Athens and Sparta
 Beavers
 Romulus and Remus
 The Buffalo Herds
 Captain William Bligh
 Peter the Great
 Fur Trading
 George Washington
 Robert Perry
 Egypt
 The Vikings
 The Phoenicians
 Frederick Douglass
 Al Rashid
 Pioneers in Early America
 The Early Boat Builders
 Antoni van Leeuwenhoek
 The African Gold Coast
 Gorillas
 The Picard Brothers
 The Whaling Ships
 Montgolfier
 The Treasure Ships
 The Eskimos
 Prehistoric Man
 Mount Olympus
 Vasco de Gama
 James Watt
 The Middle Ages
 California Gold Rush
 Christopher Columbus
 Louis Blériot
 Peter the Hermit
 Pueblo Indians
 Kier and Drake
 Abraham Lincoln
 Guglielmo Marconi
 Benjamin Franklin
 Emperor Nero of Rome
 The Covered Wagons
 Easter Island
 The Cave Paintings of Altamira
 Louis Pasteur
 The Search for Ancient Troy
 Jacques Cousteau
 The Statue of Liberty
 John Cabot
 John Smith and Pocahontas
 The Middle Ages
 Thor Heyerdahl
 The Declaration of Independence
 Johannes Gutenberg
 The History of Rockets
 Galileo Galilei
 Early Man
 Ponce de León
 The Erie Canal
 Charles Darwin (1)
 The Duryea Brothers
 Samuel De Champlain
 The Customs of China
 Michelangelo
 Thomas Paine
 Charles Lindbergh
 Early Crete
 The Australian Aborigines
 Eskimo Life
 Pompeii and Mount Vesuvius
 Lewis Carroll
 The Mystery of Stonehenge

See also
Once Upon a Time... Man
Histeria!

References

External links
 
 New York Times: "Wonderful World of Professor Kitzel"

1970s American animated television series
1972 Canadian television series debuts
1970s Canadian animated television series
American children's animated education television series
Canadian children's animated education television series
Television series by CBS Studios
Cultural depictions of Charlemagne
Cultural depictions of Leonardo da Vinci
Cultural depictions of Charles Darwin
Cultural depictions of Charles Dickens
Cultural depictions of Thomas Edison
Cultural depictions of Buffalo Bill
Cultural depictions of Joan of Arc
Cultural depictions of Hernán Cortés
Cultural depictions of Marco Polo
Works about HMS Bounty
Cultural depictions of Peter the Great
Cultural depictions of George Washington
Cultural depictions of Frederick Douglass
Cultural depictions of Vasco da Gama
Cultural depictions of Christopher Columbus
Cultural depictions of Abraham Lincoln
Cultural depictions of Guglielmo Marconi
Cultural depictions of Benjamin Franklin
Cultural depictions of Louis Pasteur
Cultural depictions of Pocahontas
Cultural depictions of Johannes Gutenberg
Cultural depictions of Galileo Galilei
Cultural depictions of Michelangelo
Cultural depictions of Thomas Paine
Cultural depictions of Charles Lindbergh
Cultural depictions of Jacques Cousteau